Cáceres is a municipality in the Brazilian state of Mato Grosso. It covers an area of 24,000km2 and as of 2020 had an estimated population of 94,861.

The town is sited on the Paraguay River, and hosts a popular fishing festival each September.
The municipality contains part of the Serra das Araras Ecological Station.
It also contains part of the Taiamã Ecological Station. 
The municipality contains the  Guirá State Park, created in 2002.

Cáceres was the starting point of the Roosevelt–Rondon Scientific Expedition.

Cáceres is the administrative headquarters of the Mato Grosso State University and counts with 13 graduation courses and 3 post graduation courses.

References

External links
 
 Cáceres Governo Municipal 
 Pantanal Escapes - Travel Guide and tourist information for Cáceres

Municipalities in Mato Grosso